Tormaleo is one of eleven parishes (administrative divisions) in the municipality of Ibias, within the province and autonomous community of Asturias, in northern Spain.

Villages and hamlets

Following are the villages and hamlets of Tormaleo:

 Buso, population 34
 Fondodevilla, population 80
 Fresno, population 10
 Luiña, population 82
 Torga, population 18
 Tormaleo, population 62
 Villares de Abajo, population 117
 Villares de Arriba, population 20

References  

Parishes in Ibias